Avi Ezri may refer to one of the following books:

 Rabbi Elazar Shach's commentary on Mishneh Torah
 A book written by Rabbi Eliezer ben Joel HaLevi